Events from the year 1976 in South Korea.

Incumbents
President: Park Chung-hee 
Prime Minister: Choi Kyu-hah

Events
 April 17 – Everland, as well known for theme park in nation's, officially was open in Gyeongi-do.

Births

 March 4 - Kim Jung-eun

Establishments

 Dongkang College.
 Meongdong Declaration.

See also
List of South Korean films of 1976
Years in Japan
Years in North Korea

References

 
South Korea
Years of the 20th century in South Korea
1970s in South Korea
South Korea